SPEEDAC, the SPErry Electronic Digital Automatic Computer,  was an early digital computer built by Sperry Corporation in 1953.

It used 800 vacuum tubes and had magnetic drum storage of 4096 18-bit words.

References

Vacuum tube computers
1953 in computing
1950s computers